Dojčin Perazić (17 December 1945 – 25 January 2022) was a Montenegrin footballer who played as a midfielder. He died in Cetinje on 25 January 2022, at the age of 76.

References

1945 births
2022 deaths
Sportspeople from Cetinje
Montenegrin footballers
Association football midfielders
FK Lovćen players
Red Star Belgrade footballers
NK Maribor players
FK Vojvodina players
ADO Den Haag players
Eredivisie players
Montenegrin expatriate footballers
Montenegrin expatriate sportspeople in the Netherlands
Expatriate footballers in the Netherlands
Montenegrin football managers
Royal Antwerp F.C. managers
Montenegrin expatriate football managers
Montenegrin expatriate sportspeople in Belgium
Expatriate football managers in Belgium